This article details the Leeds Rhinos rugby league football club's 2013 season. This was the 18th season of the Super League era. The Rhinos enter the 2013 season as champions after defeating Warrington Wolves 26-18 in the 2012 Super League Grand Final.

Pre season friendlies

Rhinos score is first.

Player appearances
Friendly Games Only

 = Injured

 = Suspended

Table

World Club Challenge

2013 fixtures and results

2013 Engage Super League

Player appearances
Super League Only

 = Injured

 = Suspended

Challenge Cup

Player appearances
Challenge Cup Games only

Playoffs

Player appearances
Play Off Games only

2013 squad statistics

 Appearances and points include Super League, Challenge Cup, Play Offs and WCC  as of 28 September 2013.

 = Injured
 = Suspended

Out of contract 2013

Players out of contract in 2013:

2013 transfers in/out

In

Out

References

External links
Leeds on Sky Sports
Leeds on Super League Site
BBC Sport-Rugby League

Leeds Rhinos seasons
Leeds Rhinos
Rugby